D. gracilis may refer to:
 Dactylosaurus gracilis, a nothosaur species
 Danuria gracilis, a praying mantis species
 Deutzia gracilis, the slender deutzia, a plant species
 Diplotaxis gracilis, a species of wall rockets found in Cape Verde
 Dipterocarpus gracilis, a tree species

Synonyms
 Dinichthys gracilis, a synonym for Heintzichthys gouldii, an extinct placoderm fish species of the Devonian
 Drosera gracilis, a synonym for Drosera peltata

See also
 Gracilis (disambiguation)